Tony "The Tiger" Scullion (born 6 February 1962) is a former dual player of Gaelic games who played Gaelic football and hurling with Derry in the 1980s and 1990s. He is chiefly known as a footballer and was part of Derry's 1993 All-Ireland Championship winning side, also winning Ulster Senior Football Championships in 1987 and 1993. With Derry footballers he usually played in the full-back line and is regarded as one of the best full-backs of his generation. Scullion played club football and hurling with St Colm's GAC Ballinascreen.

Scullion is among the few players who won four All Stars over the course of their career and was named full back on the Irish News Team of the Decade in 2004. The public voted him onto the All-Time Derry Football Team via an online poll in 2007. He has recently applied for the vacant Derry Senior football manager's job. Previous clubs he has managed include Ballinascreen, Kildress and Eglish. He was Ulster assistant manager to Joe Kernan for the 2008 Railway Cup.

Personal life

Born in Moneyneany, County Londonderry, Northern Ireland, Scullion attended the local St Eoghan's Primary School, before going to secondary school at St Colm's, Draperstown. After a further year at Magherafelt Technical College, he went on to work as a labourer for 13 years.
Tony's son Anton Scullion, 20 years old, is studying Accountancy in the University of Ulster Jordanstown and achieved top in his course in the academic year 2017–18. He is looking to follow in his father's footsteps, saying in the Derry Post: "I hope to achieve a championship medal with my County like Da and go one step further by winning a John McGlaughlin with my club." Anton is currently a key figure in the Ballinascreen Senior squad; however, he also believes his true calling is in NBA and professional gaming.

 He now works as Football Development Officer for the Ulster Council.

Football career
Scullion was a late developer and never played minor football for Derry. He was asked into the U-21 team in his last year.
The side went on to win the U-21 1983 Ulster Championship and went on to be runners up to Mayo in the All-Ireland Under-21 Football Championship after a replay.

Playing at full-back, Scullion was man of the match in both the 1987 and 1993 Ulster Senior Football Championship finals. Derry defeated Donegal in the 1993 decider in torrential rain at Clones and he is famed for his diving block in the match. Derry went on to win the 1993 All-Ireland Championship after a semi-final victory over Dublin and final defeat of Cork.

With Derry, Scullion also collected three National Football League medals in 1992, 1995 and 1996.

Scullion (like Derry Team-mate Anthony Tohill) won four GAA All Stars Awards (a record for an Ulster defender, in 1987, 1992, 1993 and 1995 (despite Derry only playing two games that year).

Along with Armagh's Martin McQuillan, Scullion won an incredible six consecutive Interprovincial Championship/Railway Cup medals with Ulster between 1989 and 1995. Only one other player ever won six Railway Cups in a row - Cork's Christy Ring.

He was runner up on three occasions for Ballinascreen in the Derry Senior Football Championship.

Hurling career
Scullion was also a keen hurling for both Ballinascreen and Derry. He played in five Derry Senior Hurling Championship finals and was man of the match in the 1989 final, despite never winning a final. He played for the Derry hurling team between 1983 and 1991.

He was part of the Derry side which were runners up to Down in the 1988 All-Ireland B final.

Honours

Football

County
All-Ireland Senior Football Championship - Winner (1): 1993
National Football League - Winner (3): 1992, 1995, 1996
Ulster Senior Football Championship - Winner (2): 1987, 1993
Ulster Senior Football Championship - Runner up: 1985, 1992
Dr McKenna Cup - Winner (1): 1993
All-Ireland Under-21 Football Championship - Runner up: 1983
Ulster Under-21 Football Championship - Winner (1): 1983

Club
Derry Senior Football Championship - Runner up: 1990, 1992, 1994
Derry Reserve Football Championship - Winner 2001
Derry Senior Football League Title - Winner 1994

Province
Railway Cup - Winner (6): 1989, 1991, 1992, 1993, 1994, 1995

Individual
All Star - Winner (4): 1987, 1992, 1993, 1995
All Star - Nominated (runner up): 1996, more?
Irish News Ulster All Stars Team of the Decade (1995-2004) - Winner
Irish News Ulster GAA All-Star - Winner 1995
Derry Senior football captain:1989,1995
Captain Derry National League winning side:1995
Captain Ulster Railway Cup winning side: 1991
Represented Ireland in two International Rules series: 1987, 1990
Father of Anton Scullion.
Godfather of Catherine Louise McGlade 
Brother of John 'Pele' Scullion (the better footballer) and Danny 'The Great' Scullion
Father of the Occupational Therapist Ciara Scullion.

Hurling

County
All-Ireland Senior 'B' Hurling Championship - Runner up: 1988

Club
Derry Senior Hurling Championship - Runner up: Five times 1989, 1997, Year?, Year?, Year?
Underage awards

Note: The above lists may be incomplete. Please add any other honours you know of.

References

External links

Hogan Stand article on Tony Scullion
Ulster GAA profile (as Football Development Officer)
Interview with Irish Abroad's Séamas Mac Giolla Fhinnéin

1962 births
Living people
Ballinascreen Gaelic footballers
Ballinascreen hurlers
Derry inter-county Gaelic footballers
Derry inter-county hurlers
Dual players
Winners of one All-Ireland medal (Gaelic football)